Mobina S. B. Jaffer  (born August 20, 1949) is a Canadian Senator representing British Columbia.

Early life and career
Born to a Pakistani family living in Africa, Jaffer was educated in England and Canada. She earned a law degree from the University of London in 1972 and attended the Executive Development program at Simon Fraser University. She lives in Vancouver, British Columbia.

Jaffer is a past member of the Girl Guides of Canada who held many volunteer roles including as a Brownie, Guide, and Pathfinder Leader, and as an elected Commissioner.

Jaffer has practised law in British Columbia since 1978 at the firm Dohm, Jaffer and Jeraj. She was appointed Queen's Counsel in 1998. Since 1997, Jaffer has been vice-chair of the Canadian membership committee for the Association of Trial Lawyers of America and, since 1993, a member of the board of governors of the Trial Lawyers of British Columbia. She has also been active with the Immigrant and Refugee Board.

In 2014, Jaffer was one of the recipients of the Top 25 Canadian Immigrant Awards presented by Canadian Immigrant Magazine.

Canadian politics
In 2002, she was appointed the Special Envoy to the Peace Process in Sudan by the Government of Canada.  The same year, she was Chair of the Canadian Committee on Women Peace & Security.

Jaffer has served as a Vice-President of the Liberal Party of Canada from 1994 to 1998 and as President of the National Women's Liberal Commission from 1998 to 2003. She also served on the board of the Liberal International in 1996. Jaffer ran unsuccessfully in the 1993 general election as the Liberal candidate in North Vancouver, and again in the 1997 election as the party's candidate in Burnaby--Douglas.

Senate tenure
She was appointed to the Canadian Senate on June 13, 2001, on the advice of Prime Minister Jean Chrétien. She sat as a Liberal.

On January 29, 2014, Liberal Party leader Justin Trudeau announced all Liberal Senators, including Jaffer, were removed from the Liberal caucus, and would continue sitting as Independents. The Senators refer to themselves as the Senate Liberal Caucus even though they are no longer members of the parliamentary Liberal caucus.

On December 20, 2018, Jaffer left the Senate Liberal Caucus to sit as a non-affiliated senator. On June 12, 2019, Jaffer joined the Independent Senators Group.

She is currently a sitting member on the Standing Senate Committees on National Security and Defence, Finance, Official Languages and Internal Affairs, and the Senate Subcommittees on Veterans Affairs and Diversity.

Controversy
The Vancouver Sun reported on January 22, 2008 that the B.C. Law Society was investigating allegations of overbilling by Jaffer and her son for allegedly charging a Catholic missionary order, the Oblates of Mary Immaculate, fees of $6.7 million for work they did between 2000 and 2004 defending the Oblates against abuse claims made by former residents of the Canadian Indian residential school system. Allegations included evidence that Ms. Jaffer's son had billed 32.4 hours of work in a single day. In 2009, the Law Society of British Columbia's Discipline Subcommittee ordered Jaffer and her son to appear before separate conduct review subcommittee panels. At its regular meeting in March 2010, the Discipline Subcommittee agreed with the recommendations of those panels that no further action should be taken.

Electoral history

References

External links
Official website
Parliament of Canada profile

1949 births
Living people
Alumni of the University of London
Canadian Ismailis
Canadian senators from British Columbia
Women members of the Senate of Canada
Lawyers in British Columbia
Liberal Party of Canada senators
Politicians from Vancouver
Simon Fraser University alumni
Ugandan expatriates in the United Kingdom
Ugandan emigrants to Canada
Women in British Columbia politics
Canadian women lawyers
Canadian King's Counsel
21st-century Canadian politicians
21st-century Canadian women politicians
Canadian politicians of Indian descent
Canadian people of Gujarati descent
Candidates in the 1993 Canadian federal election